Syed Safawi was the Managing Director and Group Chief Executive Officer (CEO) of VLCC. Prior to it, he was the Chief Executive Officer (CEO) of Viom Networks, a telecom infrastructure company, the largest independent operator in India, according to Business Standard. Before Viom Networks, Syed was with Reliance Communications Limited (RCom) as the President and CEO of the Wireless Business and Chairman of the Reliance Management Board. He worked with RCom for over two years. He was earlier with Bharti Airtel Limited as the Executive Director, responsible for the East and West India operations along with the international wireless operations. In his earlier role at Airtel, he was also responsible for the global calling cards business and the B2B business of mobile services. He went to IRMA for postgraduation and during initial period worked with Gujarat Co Operative or Amul. He is from Lucknow.

Syed is also the honorary founding president of Imamia Chamber of Commerce and Industry (ICCI)

References

http://www.business-standard.com/article/companies/how-safawi-turned-around-viom-s-fortunes-114032701285_1.html
http://indianexpress.com/article/business/business-others/shias-hope-own-industry-chamber-will-open-doors-to-business/
http://www.thehindubusinessline.com/opinion/from-jobseekers-to-jobgivers/article6160087.ece

External links
 Articles.economictimes.indiatimes.com
Forbesindia.com
Bloomberg.com
Business-standard.com
Business-standard.com
Articles.economictimes.indiatimes.com
Telecom.economictimes.indiatimes.com

Year of birth missing (living people)
Living people
Indian chief executives